The 538th Air Expeditionary Advisory Squadron is provisional unit of United States Air Force. It is assigned to the 438th Air Expeditionary Wing, and is currently located at Kabul Airport, Afghanistan.

Overview
The squadron was activated by United States Air Forces Central Command. Since November 2009, Airmen have been assessing, training, advising, and assisting Afghan pilots, loadmasters, and engineers on training, tactics, and procedures on C-27A, C-130H and Cessna 208 aircraft. Advisors have a goal to pass on to the Afghan airmen the skills to transport cargo, people and assets vital to their security.

The squadron is part of the air component of NATO's Train Advise Assist Command (TAAC-Air).

History

Lineage
 Constituted as the 538th Air Expeditionary Advisory Squadron on 23 October 2008
 Activated on 1 November 2008

Assignments
 438th Air Expeditionary Advisory Group, 1 November 2008 – present

Stations
 Kabul Airport, Afghanistan, 1 November 2008 – present

Aircraft
 C-27A Spartan, c. 2008-c. 2013
 C-208, c. 2008-present
 C-130H Hercules, 2013-present

References

 Airmen help Afghans fly C-27 mission

Air expeditionary squadrons of the United States Air Force